Arthur Douglas (16 August 1902 – 27 June 1937) was an Irish cricketer and Rugby Union player.

Cricket

A right-handed batsman and right-arm fast-medium bowler, he made his debut for the Ireland cricket team in July 1925 against Scotland in a first-class match. He went on to play for Ireland on 13 occasions, his last match coming against the MCC at Lord's in August 1933.

Of his matches for Ireland, seven had first-class status. Six of these were against Scotland, the other was against Wales. In all matches for Ireland, he scored 343 runs at an average of 14.91, with a top score of 63 against Scotland in July 1928. He took 17 wickets at an average of 30.94, with best bowling figures of 4/35 against Scotland in June 1932.

Prior to his debut for the full Irish side, he represented a North of Ireland side against Wales in June 1924.

Rugby
A winger, he made his debut for the Ireland rugby union team against France in the 1923 Five Nations, scoring one try. He played against England and Scotland the following year, scoring a try against England. He returned to the side for the 1928 Five Nations, playing just one match against Scotland, without scoring.

See also
 List of Irish cricket and rugby union players

References

1902 births
1937 deaths
Irish cricketers
Irish rugby union players
Ireland international rugby union players
Cricketers from Belfast
Cricketers from Northern Ireland
Rugby union players from Belfast